Sullo is a surname. Notable people with the surname include:

 Chris Sullo, American computer specialist
 Fiorentino Sullo (1921–2000), Italian politician 
 Salvatore Sullo (born 1971), Italian footballer

Italian-language surnames